The Department of Police (formerly known as the Department of Safety and Security) is one of the departments of the South African government. It oversees the South African Police Service and the Independent Complaints Directorate. The current Minister of Police is Bheki Cele who replaced Fikile Mbalula in February 2018.

References 
Department of Police

Police
National law enforcement agencies of South Africa
South Africa